The 1975 San Francisco State Gators football team represented San Francisco State University as a member of the Far Western Conference (FWC) during the 1975 NCAA Division II football season. Led by 15th-year head coach Vic Rowen, San Francisco State compiled an overall record of 4–4–1 with a mark of 2–3 in conference play, placing in a three-way tie for third place in the FWC. For the season the team outscored its opponents 165 to 149. The Gators played home games at Cox Stadium in San Francisco.

Schedule

Team players in the NFL
The following San Francisco State players were selected in the 1976 NFL Draft.

The following finished their college career in 1975, were not drafted, but played in the NFL.

References

San Francisco State
San Francisco State Gators football seasons
San Francisco State Gators football